LINKS (also known as Links Magazine, or Links: The Best of Golf in full) is a U.S. quarterly golf magazine published by Purcell Enterprises, Inc. in Hilton Head Island, South Carolina. LINKS has a mission "of bringing the most engaging, sophisticated and surprising content to its audience of
passionate golfers."

Overview
LINKS Magazine targets serious golfers and provides reviews of both international and national golf courses, and often focuses on course design, course architects, real estate, and golf equipment. The magazine features many advertisements and product showcases. LINKS also publishes an annual "Premier Properties Guide", a resource for buyers of golf real estate. The issue features "America's 100 Premier Properties", the oldest list of the best private golf communities in the country.

History
The magazine was launched in 1988 as Southern Links, a publication focused regionally around Hilton Head where the headquarters are located. In 1991 the company expanded its offerings with a new publication Western Links but ultimately merged the two publications in 1993 into a national publication Links: The Best of Golf.

In 2008, Links celebrated its 20th year in its January/February issue featuring Annika Sörenstam on the cover.

Notable contributors
Tom Doak
Ernie Els
Nick Faldo
Jim Nantz
George Peper
Sandy Tatum
Dick Taylor
John Updike
Jack Whitaker

Controversy

In April 2007, Links Magazine apologized to Notes from the Road for publishing false information about Baker's Bay Golf & Ocean Club.

See also
Golf Digest
Golf Magazine
Golf World

References

External links
LinksMagazine.com – official website
The History of Links Magazine
Links Magazine 20th Anniversary

Sports magazines published in the United States
Magazines established in 1988
Golf magazines
Bimonthly magazines published in the United States
Magazines published in South Carolina